Lewington is a surname. Notable people with the surname include:

 Alex Lewington (born 1991), English rugby union player
 Chris Lewington (born 1988), English footballer
 Clive Lewington (1920–1989), Australian Rules footballer
 Dean Lewington (born 1984), English footballer
 Lara Lewington (born 1979), British television presenter
 Nadine Lewington (born 1980), British actress
 Nancy Lewington, Canadian sprinter
 Peter Lewington (1950–2017) English cricketer
 Ray Lewington (born 1956), English footballer and manager
 Richard Lewington (disambiguation), multiple people
 Steven Lewington (born 1983), English professional wrestler
 Tyler Lewington (born 1994), Canadian ice hockey player